Anna Creek is a stream in the U.S. state of Montana.

Anna Creek was named by a United States Geological Survey employee in honor of a local lady.

References

Rivers of Montana
Rivers of Flathead County, Montana